The 2016 Broxbourne Borough Council election took place on 5 May 2016 to elect members of Broxbourne Borough Council in England. This was on the same day as other local elections.

Results

Ward Results

Broxbourne and Hoddesdon South

Cheshunt North

Cheshunt South and Theobalds

Flamstead End

Goffs Oak

Hoddesdon North

Hoddesdon Town and Rye Park

Rosedale and Bury Green

Waltham Cross

Wormley and Turnford

References

2016 English local elections
2016
2010s in Hertfordshire